In organizational development (OD), employee research involves the use of surveys, focus groups and other data-gathering methods to find out the attitudes, opinions and feelings of members of an organization.

See also
 Employee survey
 Interviewing
 Focus group
 Customer satisfaction

References
Peter Goudge. Employee Research: How to Increase Employee Involvement Through Consultation. Kogan Page. 2006. .

Organizational theory